Stenopsestis bruna is a moth in the family Drepanidae. It was described by Nan Jiang, Chao Yang, Dayong Xue, Hongxiang Han in 2015. It is found in the Chinese provinces of Hubei and Hunan.

The length of the forewings is 20–21 mm. The forewings are dark brown with blackish-brown transverse lines and a dark grey dot basally. The basal half and area outside the postmedial line are diffused with reddish-brown scales. The antemedial line is double and the inner line indistinct. The area between the inner antemedial line and the postmedial line is pale grey, suffused with dark grey scales on the upper part. The hindwings have indistinct transverse lines.

Etymology
The species name refers to the dark brown colour of the wings and is derived from Latin brunus (meaning brown).

References

Moths described in 2015
Thyatirinae
Moths of Asia